Sandy Sánchez Mustelier (born 24 May 1994) is a Cuban international goalkeeper, who currently plays for Las Tunas.

International career
Sanchez played in all three matches for Cuba at the 2013 FIFA U-20 World Cup.

He made his full international debut versus Curaçao on 11 June 2015. He was named in the squad for the 2015 CONCACAF Gold Cup.

International goals
Scores and results list Cuba's goal tally first.

References

External links
 

1994 births
Living people
Cuban footballers
Cuba international footballers
Cuba youth international footballers
Association football goalkeepers
FC Las Tunas players
Don Bosco Jarabacoa FC players
Cuban expatriate footballers
Cuban expatriate sportspeople in the Dominican Republic
Expatriate footballers in the Dominican Republic
2015 CONCACAF Gold Cup players
2019 CONCACAF Gold Cup players
People from Las Tunas Province